David Kolb (born 1939) is an American philosopher and the Charles A. Dana Professor Emeritus of Philosophy at Bates College in Maine.

Kolb received a B.A. from Fordham University in 1963 and an M.A. in 1965.  He later received a M.Phil. from Yale University in 1970 and a Ph.D. in 1972.  Kolb's Dissertation was titled "Conceptual Pluralism and Rationality." Most of Kolb's writing deals with "what it means to live with historical connections and traditions at a time when we can no longer be totally defined by that history."  Professor Kolb taught at the University of Chicago before moving to Bates in 1977 and teaching there until 2005, when he took emeritus status.

Works
Kolb has written many articles and published several books including:
The Critique of Pure Modernity: Hegel, Heidegger, and After, 1987
Postmodern Sophistications: Philosophy, Architecture, and Tradition, 1990
New Perspectives on Hegel's Philosophy of Religion, 1992
Socrates in the Labyrinth: Hypertext, Argument, Philosophy, 1994
Sprawling Places, 2008

See also
American philosophy
List of Bates College people
Lists of philosophers
List of American philosophers

References

External links
dkolb.org
bates.edu

1939 births
Living people
20th-century American philosophers
21st-century American philosophers
American logicians
American metaphysics writers
American political philosophers
Bates College faculty
Fordham University alumni
Hegelian philosophers
Idealists
Romanticism
Social philosophers
Theoretical historians
Yale University alumni